I World Rhythmic Gymnastics Championships were held in Budapest, Hungary on 7 and 8 December 1963.

Participants
There were 28 competitors from 10 countries - Czechoslovakia, Soviet Union, Bulgaria, Hungary, Finland, German Democratic Republic, Romania, Poland, Spain & Yugoslavia.

Medal table 
There was two routines performed by each gymnast - freehand and with apparatus.

Individual

Freehand

Apparatus

All-Around

References

Rhythmic Gymnastics World Championships
International sports competitions in Budapest
G
G
G
World Rhythmic Gymnastics Championships